INS Arihant (SSBN 80) (Sanskrit: Vanquisher of Enemies), designated S2 Strategic Strike Nuclear Submarine, is the lead ship of India's  of nuclear-powered ballistic missile submarines. The 6,000 tonne vessel was built under the Advanced Technology Vessel (ATV) project at the Ship Building Centre in the port city of Visakhapatnam.

Arihant was launched on 26 July 2009, the anniversary of Vijay Diwas (Kargil War Victory Day) by Prime Minister Manmohan Singh. After fitting out and extensive sea trials, on 23 February 2016, she was confirmed as ready for operations, commissioned in August 2016, and deployed operationally in 2018.

Design

INS Arihant is the first of the planned five in the class of submarines designed and constructed as a part of the Indian Navy's secretive Advanced Technology Vessel (ATV) project. The ATV project was set up in 1984, under Vice Admiral Mihir K. Roy as the first Director General. Their crew were to have the opportunity to train on INS Chakra, an Akula-class submarine, which the Indian Navy leased from Russia. Arihant is intended to be more of "a technology demonstrator" than a fully operational SSBN according to Admiral Nirmal Verma.

The vessel is powered by an 83 MW pressurised light-water reactor with enriched uranium fuel. A land-based prototype of the reactor was first built at Kalpakkam and made operational in September 2006. Successful operation for three years yielded the data that enabled the production version for Arihant. It was reported that an 80 MW nuclear reactor was integrated into the hull of the ATV in January 2008.

The hull for the vessel was built by L&T's Hazira shipbuilding facility. Tata Power Strategic Engineering Division (SED) built the control systems for the submarine. The systems for the steam turbine integrated with the reactor were supplied by Walchandnagar Industries. Consultancy was provided by Russia. Russia was also reported to have provided assistance to Bhabha Atomic Research Centre (BARC) scientists in miniaturising the reactor to fit into the hull of the nuclear submarine

Armament

Arihant has four vertical launch tubes, which can carry 12 (three per launch tube) smaller K-15 missiles or four larger K-4 missiles.

Development phases
A nuclear scientist familiar with the project, on the condition of anonymity, echoed this report in response to media reports that India had successfully launched a completed nuclear submarine. It was also expected that building the reactor, integration of systems, and sea trials would take three to five years.

Admiral Verma told reporters on 7 August 2012 that sea trials of Arihant were commencing in coming months, and she was steadily progressing towards operationalisation. On 27 January 2013, Sagarika, the primary armament of Arihant, completed its final developmental test and was later integrated with the submarine. On 10 August 2013, the nuclear reactor of the submarine went critical this after several months of system checks using shore-based high-pressure steam. The reactor's power was raised in increments of 5 to 10% until it reached full power.

Launch
INS Arihant was introduced to the public on 26 July 2009 at a symbolic launch ceremony by Prime Minister Manmohan Singh's wife Gursharan Kaur. The launch coincided with the 10th anniversary of the conclusion of the Kargil War. The vessel was floated by flooding the dry dock. Gursharan Kaur cracked a coconut on the hull to mark the launch of the submarine, a naval tradition,  at the secret naval base in Visakhapatnam. Photography was prohibited and photos showing the complete vessel were not available. In his address to the crowd, Prime Minister Singh billed the submarine as an outcome of a public-private partnership. He also thanked Russia in his address. The launch of Arihant strengthened India's endeavour to build a credible nuclear triad – the capability to fire nuclear weapons from air, land and sea.

Trials and commissioning

On 13 December 2014, Arihant sailed north along the Bay of Bengal coast for its extensive sea trials. The sea trials included the firing of the indigenous submarine-launched Sagarika ballistic missile.

On 25 November 2015, an unarmed Sagarika missile was successfully test-fired from Arihant. The submarine then underwent further extensive sea trials, which were completed by early February 2016. Though it had initially been expected Arihant would be commissioned in time to participate in the International Fleet Review 2016, her participation was subsequently ruled out due to security concerns. On 23 February, Arihant was officially confirmed as ready for operations.

According to The Economic Times, several weapons trials of INS Arihant were undertaken secretly.

In August 2016, Prime Minister Narendra Modi commissioned INS Arihant into the Indian Navy. Commissioning and arming Arihant completed India's nuclear triad.

Operational history

2017 accident 
In January 2018 it was reported that an aft hatch on the submarine was left open by mistake while the Arihant was docked in 2017, leading to saltwater flooding the propulsion area, rendering the submarine inoperative for ten months while corroding pipes were replaced.

First deterrence patrol 
It was announced on 5 November 2018 that INS Arihant had completed its first 20-day long deterrent patrol the previous day. PM Narendra Modi congratulated the crew of Arihant after the patrol.

User training launch 
To prove crew competency and validate the SSBN programme, INS Arihant on 14 October 2022 successfully launched an SLBM with a predetermined range and hit the target area in the Bay of Bengal with high accuracy. As per a defence source quoted by The Hindu, the missile launched was not the K-4 SLBM but the older K-15 SLBM. At present INS Arihant is armed with K-15 Sagarika SLBM, which possess a range of 750 km.

See also
 , second submarine in Arihant class
 List of active Indian Navy ships
 , home-port of the Arihant class.
 Submarines of the Indian Navy

References

External links

Arihant-class submarines
Ballistic missile submarines
Nuclear-powered submarines
Ships built in India
Submarines of India
2009 ships
India–Russia relations
Submarine classes

fr:Classe Arihant